Calostoma fuhreri is a species of gasteroid fungus in the family Sclerodermataceae. Found in Australia, the original specimens were collected by mycologist Bruce Fuhrer, for whom the species is named. Atop the peridium is an irregular stoma (opening) that is red on the inside. Inside the peridium is a white gleba that consists of spores, basidia, and broken hyphae. The spores are oblong to elliptical, hyaline (translucent), and typically measure 20–26 by 9–11 µm.

References

External links

Fungi of Australia
Fungi described in 1986
Boletales